The  is an annual poll conducted by Hayakawa's S-F Magazine for the best Japanese short story, illustrator, and foreign short story, voted by the readers from their issues in the previous year. The honor has been awarded since 1989.

Award winners

Foreign Short Story
 Thomas M. Disch, "The Brave Little Toaster Goes to Mars" (Translator: Hisashi Asakura) (1989)
 Mike Resnick, "For I Have Touched the Sky" (Translator: Masayuki Uchida) (1990)
 John Varley, "Tango Charlie and Foxtrot Romeo" (Translator: Hisashi Asakura) (1991)
 John Morressy, "Timekeeper" (Translator: Youko Miki) (1992)
 James Tiptree, Jr. "With Delicate Mad Hands" (Translator: Norio Itou) (1993)
 Ted Chiang, "Understand" (Translator: Shigeyuki Kude) (1994)
 Greg Egan, "Learning to Be Me" (Translator: Makoto Yamagashi) (1995)
 Greg Bear, "Heads" (Translator: Kazuko Onoda) (1996)
 James Tiptree, Jr. "Come Live With Me" (Translator: Norio Itou) (1997)
 Greg Egan, "Wang's Carpet" (Translator: Makoto Yamagishi) (1998)
 Bruce Sterling, "Taklamakan" (Translator: Takashi Ogawa) (1999)
 Greg Egan, "Oceanic" (Translator: Makoto Yamagishi) (2000)
 Ted Chiang, "Story of Your Life" (Translator: Shigeyuki Kude) (2001)
 Ted Chiang, "Seventy-Two Letters" (Translator: Youichi Shimada) (2002)
 Greg Egan, "Mister Volition" (Translator: Makoto Yamagishi) (2003)
 Connie Willis, "The Last of the Winnebagos" (Translator: Ohmori Nozomi) (2004)
 Jeffrey Ford, "The Empire of Ice Cream" (Translator: Tomo Inoue) (2005)
 Bradley Denton, "Sergeant Chip" (Translator: Naoya Nakahara) (2006)
 Ian McDonald, "The Djinn's Wife" (Translator: Masaya Shimokusu) (2007)

Japanese Short Story
 Mariko Ōhara, "Aqua Planet" (1989)
 Shinji Kajio, "Jinii Ni Kansuru Oboegaki" (1990)
 Mariko Ōhara, "Ephemera" (1991)
 Goro Masaki, "Venus City" (1992)
 Hiroyuki Morioka, "Spice" (1993)
 Osamu Makino, "Mouse Trap" (1994)
 Masaki Yamada, "Dead Soldier's Live" (1995)
 Jin Kusagami, "Tokyo Kaika Ereki no Karakuri" (1996)
 Kōshū Tani, "Eriko" 1 (1997)
 Yasumi Kobayashi, "Umi o Miru Hito" (1998)
 English translation: "The Man Who Watched the Sea" (Speculative Japan 2, Kurodahan Press, 2011)
 Hōsuke Nojiri, "Taiyō no Sandatsusha" (1999)
 Later rewritten into the novel Usurper of the Sun (English translation was released by Haikasoru.)
 Masaya Fujita, "Kiseki no Ishi" (2000)
 Chōhei Kanbayashi, "Hadae no Shita" (2001)
 Mizuhito Akiyama, "Ore ha Missile" (2002)
 Issui Ogawa, "Rou Voles no Wakusei" (2003)
 Hiroshi Sakurazaka, "Saitama Chainsaw Shoujo" (2004)
 English translation: "The Saitama Chain Saw Massacre" (Hanzai Japan, Haikasoru, 2015)
 Hiroshi Yamamoto, "Medousa no Jumon" (2005)
 Masaya Fujita, "Daafu no Shima" (2006)
 Keikaku Itō, "The Indifference Engine" (2007)

Illustrator
 Hiroyuki Katou & Keisuke Goto (1989)
 Mafuyu Hiroki (1990)
 Hiroyuki Katou & Keisuke Goto, Hitoshi Yoneda (tie) (1991)
 Mafuyu Hiroki (1992)
 Hiroyuki Katou & Keisuke Goto (1993)
 Keinojou Mizutama (1994)
 Jun Kosaka (1995)
 Hiroyuki Katou & Keisuke Goto (1996)
 Hikaru Tanaka (1997)
 Hikaru Tanaka (1998)
 Youkou Fujiwara (1999)
 Kenji Tsuruta (2000)
 Hikaru Tanaka (2001)
 Mikio Masuda (2002)
 Youkou Fujiwara (2003)
 Aya Takano (2004)
 Aya Takano (2005)
 Katsukame Hashi (2006)
 Kashima (2007)

References
 sfadb: Hayakawas SF Magazine Readers Award
 List of Hayakawa SF Magazine's Reader Awards

See also
Seiun Award - Japanese Hugo Awards equivalent
SF Ga Yomitai! (lit., We Want to Read SF!) - Japanese yearly book, which conducts an annual poll, edited by Hayakawa's S-F Magazine.

1989 establishments in Japan
Awards established in 1989
Japanese science fiction
Japanese literary awards
Japanese science fiction awards